Our Lady of Peace is a Roman Catholic parish with a church and K-8 school. It is located in Millcreek Township in Erie County, Pennsylvania. 

The Our Lady of Peace Parish provides philanthropic services in the Diocese and to those in need who may reside outside of the County or State.

School
The parish also has a school with approximately 404 students.  Average class size of the school is around 20 students for Kindergarten through 8th grade.  The Our Lady of Peace school is not one of the selected schools to close in the Diocese.

History
Our Lady of Peace Parish was established on September 30th, 1955 by Archbishop John Mark Gannon.  On October 1st, Archbishop Gannon appointed Father Daily as the founding pastor.  The Millcreek School Board gave permission to OLP to use the high school auditorium for Sunday Masses. 

As of 2006, the diocesan headquarters was also located in Millcreek.

Diocese
Our Lady of Peace is a parish within the Roman Catholic Diocese of Erie. There are 39 parishes within the Diocese of Erie.  The Diocese also has 15 Catholic schools within Erie County.

References

External links
 
 Our Lady of Peace School

Churches in Pennsylvania
Churches in Erie County, Pennsylvania